Lake Macquarie City FC is a football club in Lake Macquarie, New South Wales. The club was formed in 1912 formed by a group of Scottish miners in the area.

History
Lake Macquarie City Football Club is one of the oldest running football clubs in the Northern NSW region. The club has a strong history and reputation of developing, fostering and producing local players. Throughout its history, the club has been lucky enough to host a number of high-profile matches including Australian National Team games and a friendly game against Tottenham Hotspur FC.

Historically LMCFC home kit is Yellow shirt, blue shorts and white socks.  Similar to that of the Brazil national team.  Recent times have seen the white socks replaced by yellow socks for reasons unknown.  Some supporters have been calling for a return to the original white socks.

For season 2021, the club has rebranded with a new logo. The kits of LMCFC from season 2021 onward are blue and white in colour.

Recent seasons

2012 season

LMCFC had a magnificent return to the top tier of NNSW football finishing 2nd.

2013 season

The club had a terrible off season, losing head coach Chris Turner and a large number of quality players.  They narrowly avoided relegation by defeating fellow relegation threatened West Wallsend FC, 2–1 with a second half winning goal from captain Sean Matthews.

2014 season

In 2014, Lake Macquarie City FC again lost a number of quality players including captain Sean Matthews, Andre Gumprecht and Damian Brown and played in the NPL Northern NSW. Finishing last in the league, they were relegated to Northern NSW State League Division 1 for 2015.

2015 season

The club was captained by Tom Walker and coached by Barry Ross in the Northern NSW NEWFM First Division season.

2016 season

In 2016, Lake Macquarie City FC announced experienced duo Anthony Richards and Danny Pryde as their head coach and assistant coach respectively. The club played in the Northern NSW NEWFM First Division and had a successful season with the team winning the minor premiership. After a 2-year absence, Lake Macquarie City FC were announced as being promoted back into the NPL Northern NSW after their on-field and off-field success.

2017 season

In 2017, returned to the NPL Northern NSW and hoped to consolidate themselves as a competitive NPL club. They finished a very respectable 7th.

2018 season

Nick Webb was appointed Head Coach in 2018 but was unable to improve the club's position finishing 8th.  However, despite this captain Sam Walker finished the season as the NNSW NPL Golden Boot with 16 goals and was also named NPL NNSW Player of the year.

2019 season

LMCFC finished 9th in the league. After the season was completed Nick Webb was replaced as Head Coach by Joshua Rufo.

2020 season

LMCFC finished the season in 10th with only four points.

First Team squad

1st Grade

 Head coach: Joshua Rufo

Notable former players

References

https://northernnswfootball.com.au/sam-walker-wins-2018-graham-jennings-medal1/
https://websites.sportstg.com/comp_info.cgi?a=LADDER&compID=553479&c=1-10182-0-0-0
https://www.nbnnews.com.au/2020/10/13/lake-macquarie-city-fc-looks-to-the-future

Further reading

 http://www.theherald.com.au/story/4176363/lake-macquarie-in-revamped-npl-poll/
 http://www.theherald.com.au/story/4164578/roosters-set-to-step-up-into-new-look-npl

External links

National Premier Leagues clubs
Soccer clubs in New South Wales